Svetly is a closed rural locality (a settlement) in Saratov Oblast, Russia. Population:

Administrative and municipal status
Within the framework of administrative divisions, it is incorporated as the closed administrative-territorial formation of Svetly—an administrative unit with the status equal to that of the districts. As a municipal division, the closed administrative-territorial formation of Svetly is incorporated as Svetly Urban Okrug.

References

Notes

Sources



Rural localities in Saratov Oblast
Closed cities
Populated places established in 2002
2002 establishments in Russia